Hollywood studios may refer to:

Cinema of the United States, collectively referred to as "Hollywood", referring to an area of Los Angeles, California
Universal Studios Hollywood, a production facility and theme park in Hollywood
Disney's Hollywood Studios, a theme park within Walt Disney World in Bay Lake, Florida
Hollywood Studio Symphony
Hollywood Studio Club
Hollywood Center Studios